Azhutha Dam (Malayalam:അഴുത അണക്കെട്ട്) is a small diversion dam built on the Azhutha river which is a tributary of the Pamba River, at Azhutha in Peerumed Grama Panchayat of Idukki District, Kerala, India. It acts mainly as a diversion dam to supply water to the Idukki Dam. Azhutha dam is constructed as an augmentation dam for the Idukki Hydro Electric Project. Construction of the project started in 1987 and was expected to be commissioned in 1991. But the project overrun and was only partially commissioned in June 1998. The year of completion was 2007. The release of the water from the dam is to Azhutha river and it flows through Ranni and Ayroor taluks.

This project diverts waters from the 16.8389 km2. catchment of the Azhutha river, a tributary of Pamba river to Idukki reservoir and thereby increasing the power potential of Idukki Hydro electric Project by 57 MU.

Specifications 
Latitude : 9⁰ 33′ 50 ” N
Longitude: 76⁰ 59′ 30” E
Panchayath : Peermade
Village : Peermade
District : Idukki
River Basin : Pamba
River : Azhutha river
Release from Dam to river : Azhutha river
Taluk through which release flows : Ranni, Ayroor.
Year of completion : 2007
Name of Project : Idukki HEP
Purpose of Project : Hydro Power
Type of DamConcrete- Gravity
Classification : Weir
Maximum Water Level (MWL) : EL 960.20 m
Full Reservoir Level ( FRL) : EL 956.00 m
Storage at FRL : 0.140 Mm3
Height from deepest foundation : 13.50 m
Length : 116.30 m
&Spillway : Ungated – Overflow section
Crest Level : EL 956.00 m
River Outlet : 1 No. Circular type, 0.75 m dia

References

Dams in Kerala
Dams completed in 2007